Mesosaimia wakaharai is a species of beetle in the family Cerambycidae. It was described by Yamasako in 2014.

References

Mesosini
Beetles described in 2014